This is a list of Jupiter trojans by camp:

 List of Jupiter trojans (Greek camp)
 List of Jupiter trojans (Greek camp) (1–100000)
 List of Jupiter trojans (Greek camp) (100001–200000)
 List of Jupiter trojans (Greek camp) (300001–400000)
 List of Jupiter trojans (Greek camp) (400001–500000)
 List of Jupiter trojans (Greek camp) (500001–600000)
 List of Jupiter trojans (Greek camp) (600001–700000)
 List of Jupiter trojans (Trojan camp)
 List of Jupiter trojans (Trojan camp) (1–100000)
 List of Jupiter trojans (Trojan camp) (100001–200000)
 List of Jupiter trojans (Trojan camp) (200001–300000)
 List of Jupiter trojans (Trojan camp) (300001–400000)
 List of Jupiter trojans (Trojan camp) (400001–500000)
 List of Jupiter trojans (Trojan camp) (500001–600000)
 List of Jupiter trojans (Trojan camp) (600001–700000)

Set index articles on astronomical objects